Henri Souharce (31 March 1909 – 3 July 1974) was a French rower. He competed at the 1936 Summer Olympics in Amsterdam with the men's eight where they were eliminated in the semi-final.

References

1909 births
1974 deaths
French male rowers
Olympic rowers of France
Rowers at the 1936 Summer Olympics
European Rowing Championships medalists